Zaporizhzhia thermal power station is a large non-nuclear thermal power plant (DRES) in the purpose-built city of Enerhodar in Ukraine that was built by the Soviet Union between 1971 and 1977. It is the most powerful thermal power station in Ukraine, with an installed capacity of 2,850 MWe. Its primary fuel is coal; it can also fire natural gas and fuel oil, and has tank storage for these reserve fuels adjacent to the coal bunkers.

The plant is not equipped with any flue gas desulphurization systems, but does use electrostatic precipitators to remove fly ash prior to the flue gas being exhausted via one of the two chimneys. Like many other coal-fired generating stations, the Zaporizhzhia site encompasses an ash pond; coal ash from the boilers is delivered by pipe to the 135 hectare (333 acre) pond where it is disposed of.

The plant supplies power to the southern regions of Ukraine. Some of the power is transmitted from its substation through the Enerhodar Dnipro Powerline Crossing to the north side of the Kakhovka Reservoir.

On 4 March 2022, the thermal plant and the adjacent Zaporizhzhia Nuclear Power Plant were captured by Russian forces during the 2022 Russian invasion of Ukraine. On 5 May 2022, the thermal power plant stopped operating after it ran out of coal, as it was unable to get further deliveries due to the invasion.

Unit specifications 

As of January 1, 2021, the installed capacity is 2,850 MW:
 2 units (numbers 2 and 4) of 300 MW each with CCI-312 boilers and K-300-240-2 turbines
 2 units (numbers 1 and 3) of 325 MW each with CCI-312 boilers and K-325-23.5 turbines
 2 units (numbers 5 and 7) of 800 MW each with TGMP-204/A boilers and K-800-240-3 turbines, but not in operation

A third 800 MW unit (number 6) has been decommissioned.

A small 1 MW grid battery was added in 2021 to test grid services.

2021 accident 
On February 3, 2021, the entire city of Enerhodar, as well as several neighboring towns lost power. This was caused by an accident at the Zaporizhzhia thermal power station, where, according to the officials, power output of the plants units dropped to zero.

According to Centrenergo, the plant's operator:

In order to balance the system, power unit No. 10 of the Krivorozhskaya TPP was taken out of repair ahead of schedule. In addition, at the command of NEC Ukrenergo, power units No. 9 and 12 of Burshtynskaya TPP and No. 7 of Dobrotvorskaya TPP were synchronized to the grid and began supplying power.

See also

 List of power stations in Ukraine

References

External links
 Zaporizka Power Plant Chimney #1 at SkyscraperPage.com

Natural gas-fired power stations in Ukraine
Coal-fired power stations in Ukraine
Oil-fired power stations in Ukraine
Chimneys in Ukraine
Power stations built in the Soviet Union